Narodnaya Volya was a radical organization in Tsarist Russia.

Narodnaya Volya may also refer to:

 Narodnaja Volya (newspaper), recent Belorussian newspaper
 People's Union (Russia), also known as the Party of National Revival "Narodnaya Volya"